The 2021–22 season was FC Noah's 4th season in Armenian Premier League. Noah will participate in the Armenian Premier League, Armenian Cup and the UEFA Europa Conference League.

Season events
On 8 June, Noah announced the signing of Aleksandr Karapetyan from Ararat-Armenia.

On 1 July, Sargis Shahinyan joined Noah on a season-long loan deal from Ararat-Armenia.

On 7 July, Noah announced the signings of Igor Smirnov, Tigran Sargsyan and Pavel Ovchinnikov.

On 19 July, Charles Mark Ikechukwu joined Noah from West Armenia, whilst Aleksandr Golovnya joined on a season-long loan deal from Rodina Moscow on 20 July.

On 22 July, Arman Mkrtchyan left Noah by mutual consent.

On 25 July, Noah announced the signing of Grigori Matevosyan from Urartu.

On 5 September, Noah announced the signing of Artem Filippov from Rodina Moscow, and the return of Maksim Mayrovich from Akron Tolyatti. The following day, 6 September, Noah announced the signing of Albert Gabarayev from Volgar Astrakhan.

On 17 December, Noah announced the signing of Gevorg Tarakhchyan from Sevan, with Artur Kartashyan also joining Noah from Sevan the following day.

On 25 December, Noah announced the signing of Aleksejs Grjaznovs from Slovan Velvary.

On 29 December, Aleksandr Karapetyan left Noah after his contract was terminated by mutual agreement.

On 6 January, Noah announced the signing of Tarek Afqir from Șomuz Fălticeni.

On 9 January, Noah announced the signing of Vardan Shahatuni from Ararat-Armenia.

On 11 January, Noah announced the signing of Alexei Ciopa from Zimbru Chișinău.

On 24 January, Noah announced the signing of Hayk Musakhanyan from Energetik-BGU Minsk.

On 30 January, Noah announced the signing of Ilya Udodov from Dnepr Mogilev.

On 1 February, Dan Spătaru returned to Noah after leaving Ararat-Armenia.

On 7 February, Noah announced that they would play their home games for the rest of the season at the Armavir City Stadium in Armavir.

On 15 February, Noah announced the signing of Grigori Trufanov from SKA-Khabarovsk, with Evgheni Oancea joining from Sfîntul Gheorghe on the 16th, whilst Dmitri Lavrishchev rejoined the club from Lokomotiv Gomel on 17 February.

On 20 February, Noah announced the signing of Dramane Salou.

On 22 February, Noah announced the signing of Artur Miroyan.

On 19 March, Noah announced the signing of Okezie Prince Ebenezer from Zimbru Chisinau.

On 21 March, Noah announced that Head Coach Viktor Bulatov had left the club, with Igor Picușceac being confirmed as the clubs new Head Coach on 25 March.

Squad

Transfers

In

Loans in

Loans out

Released

Friendlies

Competitions

Overall record

Premier League

Results summary

Results by round

Results

Table

Armenian Cup

UEFA Europa Conference League

Qualifying rounds

Statistics

Appearances and goals

|-
|colspan="16"|Players away on loan:

|-
|colspan="16"|Players who left Noah during the season:

|}

Goal scorers

Clean sheets

Disciplinary record

References

FC Noah seasons
Noah
Noah